The inversion temperature in thermodynamics and cryogenics is the critical temperature below which a non-ideal gas (all gases in reality) that is expanding at constant enthalpy will experience a temperature decrease, and above which will experience a temperature increase. This temperature change is known as the Joule–Thomson effect, and is exploited in the liquefaction of gases. Inversion temperature depends on the nature of the gas. 

For a van der Waals gas we can calculate the enthalpy  using statistical mechanics as

Therefore, our inversion temperature is given where the sign flips at zero, or

,

where  is the critical temperature of the substance.

See also
 Critical point (thermodynamics)
 Phase transition
Joule-Thomson effect

References

External links
Thermodynamic Concepts and Processes (Chapter 2) (part of the Statistical and Thermal Physics (STP) Curriculum Development Project at Clark University)

Temperature
Thermodynamic properties
Engineering thermodynamics
Industrial gases
Gases